A number of steamships were named Sybil, including:

, and African ferry
SS Sybil, a French cargo ship that was beached in 1920

Ship names